PSDP may refer to:

Pashtoons Social Democratic Party, political party in Afghanistan and Pakistan
Phalon-Sawaw Democratic Party, a political party in Myanmar